Ulysses S. Grant (1822–1885) was an Union Army general in the American Civil War who later served as the president of the United States from 1869 to 1877.

General Grant may also refer to:

People
Charles Grant (British Army officer) (1877–1940), British Army general
Colquhoun Grant (British cavalry general) (1772–1835), British lieutenant general
David Norvell Walker Grant (1891–1964), U.S. Army major general
Frederick Dent Grant (1850–1912), U.S. Army major general and son of Ulysses S. Grant
Henry Grant (British Army officer) (1848–1919), British Army general
Hope Grant (1808–1875), British Army general
Ian Lyall Grant (1915–2020), British Army major general
James Grant (British Army officer, born 1720) (died 1806), British Army major general in the American Revolutionary War
James Grant (British Army officer, born 1778) (died 1852), British Army major general
Jennifer L. Grant (fl. 1990s–2020s), U.S. Air Force brigadier general
John James Grant (born 1936), Canadian Army brigadier general
Lewis Grant (colonial administrator) (1776–1852), British Army general and governor
Lewis A. Grant (1828–1918), Union Army brigadier general and brevet major general during the American Civil War
Malcolm Grant (East India Company officer) (1762–1831), British East India Company lieutenant general
Patrick Grant (Indian Army officer) (1804–1895), British Army field marshal
Scott Grant (born 1944), British Army lieutenant general
Tim Grant (general) (fl. 1970s–2000s), Canadian Army major general
William Grant (general) (1870–1939), Australian Army brigadier general
William Keir Grant (1777–1852), British Army general
Ulysses S. Grant III (1881–1968), U.S. Army major general and son of Frederick Dent Grant

Places
Kings Canyon National Park, which encompasses the Grant Grove and the former General Grant National Park
General Grant Grove, grove in Kings Canyon National Park and originally the entirety of General Grant National Park
General Grant tree, the largest Giant Sequoia in the Grant Grove section of Kings Canyon National Park

Transport
, a gunboat during the American Civil War
, a sailing ship
Grant (M3 Lee), a type of tank

See also

 
 , several ships of the U.S. Navy
 Ulysses S. Grant (disambiguation)
 President Grant (disambiguation)
 General (disambiguation)
 Grant (disambiguation)